Serbia women's national beach handball team is the national team of Serbia. It is governed by the Serbian Handball Federation and takes part in international beach handball competitions.

Results

World Championships
2008 – 8th place

European Championships
2007 – 9th place
2011 – 10th place
2015 – 11th place

See also
Serbia national beach handball team

References

External links
 Official website
IHF profile

Beach handball
Women's national beach handball teams
Beach handball